Woodrow Wilson High School (also, just “Beckley”) is a high school located in Beckley, West Virginia, teaching grades nine through twelve. It is one of four secondary schools in the Raleigh County Public School District. The school's colors are maroon and white, and the mascot is a Flying Eagle. The school's principal is Ryan Stafford. Feeder schools are Park Middle School and Beckley Stratton Middle School. In 1967, it moved from its original location to its current location at 400 Stanaford Road.

History

Beckley High School, the first public high school in the city, opened in 1917 using the facilities of the former Beckley Institute on Park Avenue. It operated there for one year, until a new high school was built on South Kanawha Street - Beckley Graded and High School.

The Town District Board of Education made plans for a new building. Through the proceeds from a bond issue, a new structure was built and was occupied in December 1925. It was named for former President Woodrow Wilson, who had died the previous year. Woodrow Wilson High School's new building was built on land adjacent to the former Beckley Institute on Park Avenue.

When the school moved to its current site, outside of main Beckley, the former site was turned into Park Junior High School (now Park Middle School).
During the first year of operation at the new site (1967–68), a record number of 2,432 students attended WWHS.

Notable alumni

 Rob Ashford, Broadway choreographer/Tony Award Winner
 Ed Evans, American politician 
 Jim Justice, coal baron, owner of The Greenbrier resort and 36th Governor of West Virginia
 Doug Legursky, Former NFL player
 Jon McBride, First and only West Virginian Astronaut
 Stephen M. Pachuta, retired United States Navy admiral
 Nick Rahall, former United States Congressman
 Chris Sarandon, actor
 Morgan Spurlock, filmmaker
 Tamar Slay, former NBA player for the New Jersey Nets and Charlotte Bobcats
 Hulett C. Smith, 27th Governor of West Virginia
Gayle Conelly Manchin, American educator, politician, former First Lady of West Virginia from 2005 to 2010

References

External links 
 Woodrow Wilson High School website
 History of Woodrow Wilson High School

Educational institutions established in 1925
Public high schools in West Virginia
Schools in Raleigh County, West Virginia
Beckley, West Virginia